Twelve Mile or Twelvemile may refer to:

Twelve Mile, Indiana, an unincorporated community
Twelvemile, Missouri, an unincorporated community
Twelve Mile Circle, part of the Pennsylvania–Delaware boundary
Twelve Mile Township in Williams County, North Dakota, USA
Twelve Mile Lake Township in Emmet County, Iowa, USA
Twelvemile Township, Madison County, Missouri
Twelve Mile, New South Wales, Australia
Twelve Mile Creek, New South Wales, Australia
A twelve nautical mile territorial waters limit

See also
Twelve Mile Creek (disambiguation)